Malaba, Gabon may refer to:
 Malaba, Ngounié
 Malaba, Nyanga